The Sony α7R II (model ILCE-7RM2) is a full-frame mirrorless interchangeable-lens camera in the Sony α7 series of cameras. It was announced by Sony on 10 June 2015. At the time of its release, it had the largest backside illuminated CMOS sensor of any camera in the market, the previous largest being used in the Samsung NX1 released only months earlier. The camera was released 5 August 2015. Some of its most notable features are the 42 megapixels and the 399 on-sensor phase detection points.

See also
Comparison of Sony α7 cameras
Sony α7R III
Sony α7II
Sony α9
Exmor R

References

External links 
 Sony α7R II dpreview

α7R II
Cameras introduced in 2015
Full-frame mirrorless interchangeable lens cameras